Cerekiew may refer to the following places in Poland:
Cerekiew, Lesser Poland Voivodeship (southern Poland)
Cerekiew, Masovian Voivodeship (east-central Poland)